Major General Ghulam Haidar Rasuli (1919 – 28 April 1978) was born in Rostaq, Takhar Province, Afghanistan and a supporter of Mohammed Daoud Khan, who came out of retirement after the 1973 coup which removed King Zahir Shah and put Daoud in power. He received early military education at the Military High School, graduating in 1933, before receiving military training in India from 1956 to 1958. In 1966, he became the director of recruitment in the Ministry of National Defense. He was placed in charge of the Central Forces of Afghanistan in 1973 and became Chief of General Staff two years later. Rasuli was appointed Minister of Defense of Afghanistan on 7 November 1977, but was killed on 28 April during the 1978 Saur Revolution. Major Gen. Ghulam Haidar Rasuli was the son of Ghulam Rasul a Muhammadzai  Barakzai from Kandahar. Ghulam Haidar Rasuli was the great grandson of the Amir Mohammad khan, brother of Amir Dost Muhammad khan Barakzai (amir of Afghanistan) from the muhammadzai Barakzai  tribe.

Sources
 

Afghan military personnel
Afghan anti-communists
1978 deaths
1919 births
Defence ministers of Afghanistan